Helene Anna Held (19 March 1872 – 12 August 1918) was a Polish-French stage performer on Broadway. While appearing in London, she was spotted by impresario Florenz Ziegfeld, who brought her to America as his common-law wife. From 1896 through 1910, she was one of Broadway's most celebrated leading ladies, presented in a succession of musicals as a charming, coquettish Parisian singer and comedienne, with an hourglass figure and an off-stage reputation for exotic behavior, such as bathing in 40 gallons of milk a day to maintain her complexion. Detractors implied that her fame owed more to Ziegfeld's promotional flair than to any intrinsic talent, but her audience allure was undeniable for over a decade, with several of her shows setting house attendance records for their time. Her uninhibited style also inspired the long-running series of popular revues, the Ziegfeld Follies.

Early life

Born in Warsaw, Congress Poland, Russian Empire, Held was named Helene Anna Held, daughter of a German Jewish glove maker, Shimmle (aka Maurice) Held, and his French-Jewish wife, Yvonne Pierre.

Sources list a variety of birth years, ranging from 1865 to 1873, but 1872 has been accepted in general. In 1881, anti-Semitic pogroms forced the family to flee to Paris, France. When her father's glove manufacturing business failed, he found work as a janitor, while her mother operated a kosher restaurant. Held began working in the garment industry, then found work as a singer in Jewish theatres in Paris and, later, after her father's death, London, where her roles included the title role in a production by Jacob Adler of Abraham Goldfaden's Shulamith; she was also in Goldfaden's ill-fated Paris troupe, whose cashier stole their money before they ever played publicly.

As a young woman in France, Held converted to Roman Catholicism.

Career

Early years

Her vivacious and animated personality proved popular and her career as a stage performer gained momentum as she became known for her risqué songs, flirtatious nature and willingness to show her legs on stage. In 1894, she married the much-older Uruguayan playboy Maximo Carrera, with whom she had a daughter, Lianne (1895–1988), who was also an actress and producer, sometimes billed as Anna Held Jr.

Touring through Europe, Held was appearing in London in 1896, when she met Florenz Ziegfeld, who asked her to return to New York City with him. He set about creating a wave of public interest in her, feeding stories to the American press, such as her having had ribs surgically removed. By the time Held and Ziegfeld arrived in New York, she was already the subject of intense public speculation. When she finally performed in a revival of A Parlor Match, the critics were dismissive, but the public approved.

Broadway success

David Monod of Wilfrid Laurier University has suggested that Held succeeded more on image than talent, the illusion she presented to  post-Victorian era audiences who were beginning to explore new social freedoms. From 1896, Held enjoyed several successes on Broadway, including A Parisian Model (1906–1907). These, apart from bolstering Ziegfeld's fortune, made her a millionaire in her own right. Ziegfeld's talent for creating publicity stunts ensured that Held's name remained well known.

Held influenced the format for what would eventually become the famous Ziegfeld Follies in 1907, and she helped Ziegfeld establish the most lucrative phase of his career. Held could not perform in the first Follies when she become pregnant by Ziegfeld in late 1908. Held's daughter Lianne later claimed in her unpublished memoirs that Ziegfeld forced Held to have an abortion because he did not want her pregnancy interfering with Miss Innocence, a show in which she would star in 1908–09. The claim was repeated in an autobiography by Held entitled Anna Held and Flo Ziegfeld, however, Richard and Paulette Ziegfeld, (authors of The Ziegfeld Touch) concluded that Held never wrote her memoirs, and Lianne was the real author of the autobiography. Eve Golden, Held's biographer, wrote that Lianne's abortion claim was likely a lie designed to demonize Ziegfeld, whom Lianne loathed.

In 1909, Ziegfeld began an affair with the actress Lillian Lorraine; Held remained hopeful that his fascination would pass, and he would return to her, but instead he turned his attentions to another actress, Billie Burke, whom he married in 1914.

Film
New York entertainment entrepreneur Oliver Morosco cast Held in the lead for Madame la Presidente in 1916. According to an interview she gave to Hector Ames for Motion Picture Classic, she was paid $25,000 for her performance.

Later years and death
After Miss Innocence, Held left Broadway. She spent the years of World War I working in vaudeville and touring France, performing for French soldiers and raising money for the war effort. She was considered a war heroine for her contributions, and was highly regarded for the courage she displayed in traveling to the front lines, to be where she could do the most good.

The year 1917 was one of constant touring for Held; she toured the United States in a production of Follow Me until ill health caused her to close the show in January 1918. She then checked into the Hotel Savoy in New York City where her health continued to decline. Held had been battling multiple myeloma, a cancer of plasma cells, for a year. News coverage began reporting that it had been caused by her practice of excessive lacing of her corsets to give her a tiny waist.

According to the Washington Times, Held had been in and out of consciousness for about a week. On 12 August 1918, her doctor pronounced her dead, and the media was alerted. Approximately two hours later, Held revived, and the media notified she was still alive, only to have Held finally die shortly thereafter.

Held's funeral was held at St. Patrick's Cathedral in Manhattan on 14 August.  Florenz Ziegfeld did not attend as he had a phobia about death and never attended funerals. Held is interred at Cemetery of the Gate of Heaven in Hawthorne, New York.

Legacy

The MGM film The Great Ziegfeld (1936) tells a sanitized version of the Ziegfeld-Held relationship. Luise Rainer won an Academy Award for her performance as Held. Ziegfeld and Burke were played by William Powell and Myrna Loy.
In 1978, Columbia Pictures released a made-for-television film on NBC, Ziegfeld: The Man and His Women. Held was portrayed by Barbara Parkins.
The American poet Carl Sandburg wrote a memorial poem for Anna Held, An Electric Sign goes Dark, in the collection Smoke and Steel.
In 1976, Held's daughter Lianne Carrera opened a museum of her mother's personal and stage items in San Jacinto, California.

Stage

Filmography

References

Further reading
 Eve Golden, Anna Held and the Birth of Ziegfeld's Broadway, Lexington: University Press of Kentucky, 2000

External links

 
 
 New York Times article announcing Held's death
 Article about Held in Theatre Magazine
Anna Held picture gallery
Anna Held portraits (New York Public Library)
Portrait gallery (University of Washington, Sayre collection)
 Anna's 1901 film; "Champagne"(Wayback Machine)
Anna Held  driving her Maxwell motorcar

1872 births
1918 deaths
19th-century French actresses
20th-century French actresses
Actresses from Paris
Burials at Gate of Heaven Cemetery (Hawthorne, New York)
Deaths from cancer in New York (state)
Converts to Roman Catholicism from Judaism
Deaths from multiple myeloma
French emigrants to the United States
19th-century French women singers
French film actresses
French musical theatre actresses
French Roman Catholics
French silent film actresses
French stage actresses
Emigrants from the Russian Empire to France
Jewish French actresses
Jewish women singers
20th-century American women singers
Vaudeville performers
Ziegfeld girls